Warning Glacier is a glacier descending sharply on the west side of Adare Peninsula to discharge into Robertson Bay 4 nautical miles (7 km) north of Nameless Glacier, in Victoria Land. First charted by the British Antarctic Expedition, 1898–1900, under C.E. Borchgrevink. The feature was so named by Borchgrevink because southerly gales at Cape Adare were always heralded by a cloud of snow sweeping over this glacier into Robertson Bay.

Glaciers of Pennell Coast